Middle Palisade Glacier consists of two glaciers in the Sierra Nevada mountains, in the U.S. state of California. Middle Palisade and Disappointment Peak are immediately west of the glacier.

See also
List of glaciers in the United States

References

Glaciers of California
Glaciers of Inyo County, California
Glaciers of the Sierra Nevada (United States)